Corinthian Hockey Club (Irish: Club Haca Corantaigh) is a field hockey club based at Saint Columba's College, Dublin, Ireland. In 2018–19 they became founder members of the new Division 2 in both the Men's Irish Hockey League and the Women's Irish Hockey League.
The club's senior men also play in the Men's Irish Senior Cup while the senior women also play in the Women's Irish Senior Cup. Reserve teams play in the Men's Irish Junior Cup and the Women's Irish Junior Cup. Corinthian won the 2012 Men's Irish Junior Cup, defeating Cookstown in the final.

In the 1890s an earlier club named Corinthian, along with Monkstown and Three Rock Rovers, were among the pioneering field hockey clubs in Ireland. The modern club was founded in 1934.

Notable former players
 women's field hockey international
 Alison Meeke

Honours

Men
Irish Junior Cup
Winners: 2012

References

External links
 Corinthian Hockey Club on Facebook
 Corinthian Hockey Club on Twitter

Field hockey clubs in Dún Laoghaire–Rathdown
1934 establishments in Ireland
Field hockey clubs established in 1934
Men's Irish Hockey League teams
Women's Irish Hockey League teams
Rathfarnham